Yellow Creek may refer to:

Settlements
Canada
Yellow Creek, Saskatchewan

United States
Yellow Creek, Illinois
Yellow Creek, Bell County, Kentucky
Middlesboro, Kentucky, formerly Yellow Creek
Yellow Creek Township, Chariton County, Missouri
Yellow Creek, Ohio
Yellow Creek Township, Columbiana County, Ohio

Streams
Canada
Yellow Creek (Toronto), a tributary of the Don River, Ontario

United States
Yellow Creek (Alabama), a tributary of Luxapallila Creek
Yellow Creek (Colorado), a tributary of the White River
Yellow Creek (Chestatee River tributary), Georgia
Yellow Creek (Illinois), a tributary of the Pecatonica River
Yellow Creek (Michigan), a stream in Berrien County
Yellow Creek (Grand River tributary), Missouri
Yellow Creek (Ohio), a river of Ohio
Yellow Creek State Forest
Yellow Creek (Juniata River tributary), Pennsylvania
Yellow Creek (Two Lick Creek tributary), Pennsylvania
Yellow Creek State Park
Yellow Creek (South Dakota), a tributary of Whitewood Creek
Yellow Creek (Utah), in Bryce Canyon National Park

See also

Yellow River (disambiguation)